Victor Söderström (born 26 February 2001) is a Swedish professional ice hockey defenceman currently playing for the  Arizona Coyotes of the National Hockey League (NHL). Söderström was selected 11th overall by the Coyotes in the 2019 NHL Entry Draft.

Playing career
Söderström joined Brynäs IF as a 14-year old, playing through their junior ranks before he was elevated from the J20 SuperElit and made his professional debut at the age of 17 during the 2018–19 season on 18 October 2018. He was signed to his first professional contract by Brynäs, agreeing to a two-year deal through 2020 on 8 November 2018.

On 21 June 2019, Söderström was selected by the Arizona Coyotes, 11th overall in the 2019 NHL Entry Draft. The Coyotes traded up from the 14th overall with an additional second round pick to obtain the selection. Söderström signed a three-year, NHL entry-level contract with the Arizona Coyotes on 7 July 2019.

In the 2019–20 season, Söderström was assigned on loan by the Coyotes to continue his development with his Swedish club, Brynäs IF. He featured in 35 games from the blueline, reaching new career highs with 5 goals and 16 points in the regular season, before the playoffs were cancelled due to the COVID-19 pandemic. Söderström returned to the Coyotes organization when he was added to the return-to-play roster and remained with the club through the 2020 Stanley Cup playoffs as a healthy scratch.

With the 2020–21 North American season to be delayed, on 1 September 2020, Söderström returned to Sweden in joining second-tier club, AIK of the HockeyAllsvenskan, on loan until the commencement of the Coyotes 2020 training camp. He made 12 appearances with AIK, registering 6 points, before leaving his loan stint in the Allsvenskan to join the Swedish World Junior team.

Career statistics

Regular season and playoffs

International

References

External links
 

2001 births
Living people
AIK IF players
Arizona Coyotes draft picks
Arizona Coyotes players
Brynäs IF players
National Hockey League first-round draft picks
People from Älvkarleby Municipality
Swedish ice hockey defencemen
Tucson Roadrunners players
Sportspeople from Uppsala County